Elena Kitić (born 11 August 1997), professionally known just as Elena, is a Serbian singer-songwriter. Born in Hanover, she is the daughter of Bosnian Serb singers Mile Kitić and Marta Savić. She made her recording debut with the song "Better Days", released in October 2014 on Serbian MTV. 

In July 2016, Kitić gained more significant popularity by releasing "Folira" featuring Jala Brat, who later became her frequent collaborator. She also worked with Serbian rapper Rasta on the single "Geto princeza" (2018). Her first live performance was at Jala Brat and Buba Corelli's show at Tašmajdan Center in Belgrade, June 2018.

Elena received the award for the Best Music Video Styling at the Belgrade streetwear festival, called Sneakerville Festival, in December 2020.

Discography

Singles

As lead artist

As featured artist

Videography

References

External links
 
 

1997 births
Living people
Musicians from Hanover
21st-century Serbian women singers
Serbian pop singers
Serbian people of Bosnia and Herzegovina descent